June of 44 is an American rock band which was formed in 1994 from ex-members of Rodan, Lungfish, Rex, and Hoover. The band's name refers to the period during which writers Henry Miller and Anaïs Nin corresponded.

The band toured extensively, reaching as far as Australia. They were a collective from 1994 to 2000, and reunited in 2018. Their style consists of a post-hardcore and math rock base, while their later releases delve into experimental jazz, ambient dub and angular post-punk.

Their debut album Engine Takes to the Water (1995) drew comparisons with both Slint and Will Oldham. The following year's Tropics and Meridians saw the band compared to Tortoise and The For Carnation. Drummer Doug Scharin had started HiM as a side project, which sometimes also featured bassist Fred Erskine, and Scharin also later started the avant-garde band Out in Worship. Meadows also had a side project, forming Sonora Pine with Tara Jane O'Neill. June of 44 released three further albums, incorporating more electronics and jazz influences, before the band split up in 1999, with vocalist/guitarist Jeff Mueller forming Shipping News and vocalist Sean Meadows forming Everlasting the Way and later Letter E. Erskine joined Abilene, while Scharin continued with HiM, also guesting with several other bands. The band reunited in 2018 and released a new album titled Revisionist: Adaptations & Future Histories in the Time of Love and Survival in 2020.

Members
 Fred Erskine – bass guitar
 Sean Meadows – vocals, guitar
 Jeff Mueller – vocals, guitar
 Doug Scharin – drums

Discography

Studio albums
 Engine Takes to the Water (1995)
 Tropics and Meridians (1996)
 Four Great Points (1998)
 Anahata (1999)
 Revisionist: Adaptations & Future Histories in the Time of Love and Survival (2020)

Live albums
 In the Fishtank 6 (1999)
 "South East Boston" / "Dexterity of Luck" (2001)

EPs
 The Anatomy of Sharks (1997)

References

External links
 Southern.com link
 review at salon.com
 

Math rock groups
American post-hardcore musical groups
Musical groups from Louisville, Kentucky
Musical groups established in 1994
Musical groups disestablished in 1999
Quarterstick Records artists
Rock music groups from Kentucky
1994 establishments in Kentucky
1999 disestablishments in Kentucky